1993 is an AD year.

1993 may also refer to:

1993 (number)
1993 (TV series), a 2017 Italian television series
Iris 1993, a 1993 album by Romanian band Iris
"1993", a 2019 song by Dreamville, from the album Revenge of the Dreamers III